Ernest Hoschedé (18 December 1837 – 19 March 1891) was a department store magnate in Paris. Also during the successful period of his life, he was an art collector and critic. He lost his Impressionist art collection when he went bankrupt in 1877–1878. He moved his family into the home of Claude Monet in Vétheuil. He then lived in Paris and worked at Le Voltaire and then Magazine Français Illustré. His family continued to live with the Monets before and after his death. The year after his death, his wife Alice Hoschedé married Claude Monet, and was believed to have been Monet's mistress for years.

Early life

Ernest Hoschedé was the son of a wealthy merchant of shawls and fine lace.

Marriage
Hoschedé married a Belgian woman, Alice Raingo, who was also from a wealthy family. They lived in Paris at 64 Rue de Lisbonne and had a place at Montgeron, southeast of Paris, Château de Rottembourg. They entertained lavishly at the Château, including hiring a train from Paris to transport guests.

Career
Hoschedé was a Paris department store director, art critic, and art collector. He collected and sold the works of Claude Monet, Edgar Degas, Camille Pissarro and Alfred Sisley.
 He was best known as a patron of Claude Monet and other Impressionist painters. He also became good friends with Monet. In 1876, Hoschedé commissioned Monet to paint decorative panels for the Château de Rottembourg and several landscape paintings. According to the Nineteenth-century European Art: A Topical Dictionary, it may have been during this visit that Monet began a relationship with Alice Hoschedé and her youngest son, Jean-Pierre, may have been fathered by Monet.

Hoschedé lived an "extravagant lifestyle" and became bankrupt in 1877. For a period of time Hoschedé went to Belgium to escape his creditors. His art collection was auctioned off in June 1878 for a fraction of its value. This was a blow to the Impressionists, especially Monet. Although stunned by Hoschedé's financial failure, Monet was "swift to offer his support", inviting the Hoschedés to live with him and his family.

Life with the Monets
Hoschedé, his wife and their children moved into a house in Vétheuil with Monet, Monet's ailing first wife Camille, and the Monet's two sons Jean and Michel. Needing a bigger home for the 12 member Monet and Hoschedé families and the Monet's servants, they moved into a larger house on the road from Vétheuil to La Roche-Guyon.

Paris
Hoschedé spent most of his time in Paris, having found employment at Le Voltaire newspaper. He kept his family in Vétheuil where it was cheaper to live. After Camille Monet's death in 1879, Monet and Alice (along with the children from the two respective families) continued living together at Poissy and later at Giverny.

He worked then at the Magazine Français Illustré as an art editor. Hoschedé developed a severe case of gout in early 1891 after years of overeating and drinking. As his illness became more severe, Alice came to Paris to care for him.

Death
Ernest Hoschedé died in 1891 a poor man. His funeral and burial, which were held at Giverny at his children's request, were paid for by Monet.

The following year Alice married Claude Monet.

See also
Claude Monet
Blanche Hoschedé Monet

Notes and references

1891 deaths
Claude Monet
French art collectors
Businesspeople from Paris
1837 births
19th-century French businesspeople
French art patrons